Heinroth's shearwater (Puffinus heinrothi) is a poorly known seabird in the family Procellariidae. Probably a close relative of the little shearwater or Audubon's shearwater (with which it is sometimes considered conspecific), it is distinguished by a long and slender bill and a brown-washed underside.

This species is restricted to the seas around the Bismarck Archipelago and northern Solomon Islands. The breeding sites of the species have never been found, although reports of individuals (including recently fledged chicks) on Bougainville and Kolombangara strongly suggest that they breed there, possibly high in the mountains (an inference based on the breeding behaviour of close relatives). There is very little information about the species and it is uncertain if it is threatened or in decline.

References

BirdLife International (2006) Species factsheet: Puffinus heinrothi. Downloaded from http://www.birdlife.org on 26/7/2006

External links
BirdLife species factsheet

Heinroth's shearwater
Birds of the Bismarck Archipelago
Birds of Bougainville Island
Heinroth's shearwater